Konstantin Igorevich Pliyev (born 26 October 1996) is a Russian football player. He plays as centre-back for FC Alania Vladikavkaz.

Club career
He made his professional debut in the Russian Professional Football League for FC Alania Vladikavkaz on 12 August 2014 in a game against FC Anzhi-2 Makhachkala.

His loan by FC Baltika Kaliningrad from FC Rostov was terminated on 25 December 2018.

On 9 July 2019, he joined FC Rubin Kazan on loan for the 2019–20 season.

On 25 September 2020, he was loaned to FC Ufa for the 2020–21 season.

On 25 February 2021, he moved to Ufa permanently in exchange to Kirill Folmer going in the opposite direction.

Career statistics

Personal life
His older brother Zaurbek Pliyev is also a football player.

References

External links
 
 

1996 births
Sportspeople from Vladikavkaz
Ossetian people
Living people
Russian footballers
Association football defenders
FC Spartak Vladikavkaz players
FC Volgar Astrakhan players
FC Rostov players
FC Baltika Kaliningrad players
FC Rubin Kazan players
FC Ufa players
Russian Premier League players
Russian First League players
Russian Second League players